Meyerton may refer to:

 Meyerton, Gauteng, South Africa
 Meyerton, Baker Island, United States Minor Outlying Islands (Pacific Ocean)